M4 is a Hungarian expressway (constructed to motorway standards on its final section before reaching the border) which will, upon completion, connect Budapest to Oradea and further Romanian cities. The route will travel in Hungary through Cegléd, Szolnok, Karcag, Püspökladány, Berettyóújfalu, and Nagykereki before reaching the Romanian border.

History, finished sections and future plans
The road's origins can be traced much further back in time - as far back as 1974, when the first section of the future motorway was opened. This section, from Albertirsa to Cegléd, served to bypass the older, congested Route 40, that passed through these towns. This was extended in 2005 to bypass Abony and Szolnok. The same year, the Törökszentmiklós bypass opened. On 6 July 2011, a bypass also opened at Kisújszállás. Most of these sections were only 1 lane per direction.

The 10 km long Vecsés-Üllő bypass opened in 2004, completed up to expressway standards. The section also helped ease accessing the Liszt Ferenc International Airport. However, this had left a gap between Albertirsa and Üllő, and the old road going through Monor soon became a bottleneck. The missing 29 kilometer long section of M4 was completed on February 7, 2020.

The section going south of Szolnok was found to be unsuitable to upgrade to motorway status, so on 16 September 2013, a contract was signed regarding the new route of the motorway. This route would go northwards of Szolnok, crossing the Tisza rivers, and shortening the route of the motorway. Construction contract was awarded to Strabag, with the estimated costs reaching 100 billion Hungarian Forints. Since the motorway passes through an environmental area, protective fencing was to be installed on the new sections from Üllő towards Törökszentmiklós. Whilst this section was supposed to open by 2016, construction work was stopped on 30 June 2015, to investigate the companies who were building the road. Apparently, the project was submitted to the EU to be supported in 2013, but it never received approval. Another issue was the huge cost of the route - 4 Billion HUF per kilometer. The work on this section restarted in 2018, and it opened to traffic in 2022.

A 4 kilometer stretch of M4, near Berettyóújfalu, was inaugurated on December 20, 2018. This section serves to link the M35 motorway to Route 47. 

In 2019, a section near Cegléd section was upgraded to a dual carriageway, but it only reached expressway status after the connecting section between Cegléd and Abony was completed in the summer of 2020.

Works at the other end of the planned motorway started in 2016, specifically on the Berettyóújfalu-Nagykereki section, which would connect to the Romanian A3 motorway, towards Oradea, Cluj, Târgu Mureș and Bucharest. However, just like the work on the A3 motorway in Romania, construction temporarily stopped due to funding issues. In 2018, Hungary received up to 265 million Euros from the EU Cohesion Funds specifically to complete this section of M4. It was opened on September 4, 2020.

Preparatory work has started for the Törökszentmiklós-Kisújszállás-Karcag-Püspökladány-Berettyóújfalu section. This section envisaged an interchange with the M8 motorway, but the procurement procedure was abolished on 26 February 2014, leaving work halted on this section.

Junctions, exits and rest areas 

Distance from the Zero Kilometre Stone (Adam Clark Square) in Budapest in kilometres.

 The section between Budapest and Berettyóújfalu is expressway.
 The section between Berettyóújfalu and Nagykereki is motorway.

 Under construction
 Planned section

References 

4
Proposed roads in Hungary